Forest Springs is a rural unincorporated community in southern Allen County, Kentucky, United States.

References

Unincorporated communities in Allen County, Kentucky
Unincorporated communities in Kentucky